Sir Charles Thompson, 1st Baronet (c.1740 – 17 March 1799) was a British naval officer.  After long service in the Seven Years' War, American War of Independence and War of the First Coalition, he was Admiral John Jervis's second in command at the battle of Cape St Vincent.  However, his disregard for Jervis's signal to tack to counter a Spanish attacking move nearly lost the battle, and began an enmity with Jervis that eventually (with ill health) led to Thompson's retirement.  From 1796 to 1799 he was also MP for Monmouth.

Family 
His father is thought to have been Norborne Berkeley, later Baron Botetourt, of Stoke Gifford, Gloucestershire, governor of Virginia, his mother was Margaret Thompson. (Charles was illegitimate). He, his mother and sister Elizabeth Thompson were all beneficiaries in Norborne Berkeley's will. He married Jane, daughter and heiress of Robert Selby of Bonnington, near Edinburgh in 1783, by whom he had issue: Norborne Charles (1785–1826) who joined the navy but was court martialed for insubordination; Charles Robert (1788–1801) who died at sea aged 13; Elizabeth (1790-, Jane (1794–1815) who died in Portugal aged 21, and is buried at the English Cemetery, Lisbon; and Henry (1796–1868).

Naval service 
In the following five years he served on that ship then on HMS Prince Frederick and (under Captain Samuel Barrington) . When peace came, this ship was paid off and Thompson transferred to the sloop , serving on her on the North American station from August 1763 to her paying-off in July 1768 in South Carolina (with no transport provided to get her officers back to England, though they were later paid £39 0s. 6d each for the journey).

He took the later ship back to England in December 1771 and, though his acting captaincy was not confirmed by the admiralty, they did on 7 March 1772 promote him to full captain, commanding .

Service in the West Indies 
Thompson sailed to the West Indies commanding , the flagship of Vice-Admiral William Parry, and later moved to the frigate . He accompanied a merchant convoy to England in October 1777, before yet again going out to the West Indies in 1780. Sir John Laforey was appointed commissioner of the shipyard at Antigua in 1780, but Thompson refused to recognize this authority, leading to a long feud. In the Caribbean, Thompson was moved by Sir George Rodney to the 74-gun , commanding her throughout the American War of Independence, including at the battles of the Chesapeake, St Kitts, under Sir Samuel Hood). In April 1782, Thompson was present in the rear division at the Battle of the Saintes. Sir George Rodney's decisive victory over the French in the Caribbean. He sailed Alcide back to England at the end of the War.

Later service 
In 1787 Thompson commanded  at Portsmouth, and in 1790  (during the crisis of the Spanish armament). Also during this time in the Indies, Laforey and Thompson's feud reignited over Laforey conduct as commander-in-chief at the Leeward Islands, thus providing an excuse for First Lord of the Admiralty to recall Laforey but causing alarm amidst the other Admiralty commissioners (Sir Charles Middleton resigned over the affair).

Mediterranean service 

In Britannia he acted as second in command at the battle of Cape St Vincent, disregarding Jervis's signal to tack to counter a Spanish attacking move and thus nearly losing the battle. This angered Jervis but he chose not to bring the issue into the public sphere, and so later that year Thompson's and Jervis's contribution to the battle were rewarded with a baronetcy and an earldom respectively whilst still on station. Continuing on the station for a time, Thompson's next disagreement with Jervis (over the latter's insistence on hanging two mutineers on the Sabbath on Sunday 9 July 1797) gave Jervis sufficient justification to insist that the Admiralty recall Thompson. After Thompson's death, Jervis wrote of him as a ‘gallant man, but the most timid officer’, and drew attention to his having ‘the manner of a rough seaman’ which Thompson cultivated by his habit of dressing casually in a sailor's frock and straw hat.

On his recall, Thompson was then given a post in the Brest-blockade fleet which he held until 1798 despite failing health, his health eventually forcing him to strike his flag and return to England early in 1799, where he died later that year. He is buried in Holy Trinity Church in Fareham with a Monument sculpted by John Flaxman RA.

Political office 
Thompson was elected MP for Monmouth in 1796 and held the seat until 1799 although he did not have a significant attendance in parliament.

References

Sources 
J. Ralfe, The naval biography of Great Britain, 2 (1828), 3
W. James, The naval history of Great Britain, from the declaration of war by France in 1793 to the accession of George IV, [8th edn], 6 vols. (1902)
D. Syrett and R. L. DiNardo, The commissioned sea officers of the Royal Navy, 1660–1815, rev. edn, Occasional Publications of the Navy RS, 1 (1994)
C. G. Pitcairn Jones, ‘List of commissioned sea officers of the Royal Navy, 1660–1815’, NMM, NMM 359 (42) (083.81) GRE
A. Aspinall, ‘Thompson, Charles’, HoP, Commons, 1790–1820
Debrett's Peerage (1834)
The dispatches and letters of Vice-Admiral Lord Viscount Nelson, ed. Nicholas Harris Nicolas, 7 vols. (1844–6); repr. (1997–8), vol. 2
M. A. J. Palmer, ‘Sir John's victory: the battle of Cape St Vincent reconsidered’, Mariner's Mirror, 77 (1991), 31–46
 Colin White, Nelson's year of destiny: Cape St Vincent and Santa Cruz de Tenerife (1998)

External links 
 Oxford Dictionary of National Biography entry. 
 A portrait of him, from 1774, by Thomas Gainsborough, now in Tate Britain

1740 births
1799 deaths
Royal Navy admirals
Members of the Parliament of Great Britain for Welsh constituencies
Baronets in the Baronetage of Great Britain
British MPs 1796–1800
Royal Navy personnel of the French Revolutionary Wars
Royal Navy personnel of the American Revolutionary War
Royal Navy personnel of the Seven Years' War